Kari Gløersen (born 11 December 1948) is a Norwegian politician for the Conservative Party.

She served as a deputy representative to the Parliament of Norway from Hedmark during the terms 1997–2001 and 2001–2005. In total she met during 37 days of parliamentary session.

References

1948 births
Living people
Conservative Party (Norway) politicians
Deputy members of the Storting
Hedmark politicians
Place of birth missing (living people)
20th-century Norwegian women politicians
20th-century Norwegian politicians
21st-century Norwegian women politicians
21st-century Norwegian politicians
Women members of the Storting